is a Japanese manga artist, known for his work Your Lie in April.

Early life
Naoshi Arakawa grew up in the countryside of Japan with an older brother. They used to get manga magazines like Weekly Shōnen Jump and Monthly Shōnen Magazine often, so he was exposed to manga from a young age. That, along with his love for Fist of the North Star and Kinnikuman was what ultimately made him decide to become a manga author.
However, he elected not to tell anyone due to the conservative nature of his hometown and his shy personality.

Career
After getting advice from a friend at college, Naoshi Arakawa decided to enter for the Monthly Shōnen Magazine Grand Challenge. The one-shot he submitted would become the basis for Your Lie in April. Afterwards, he then worked as an assistant before making his serial debut with the manga adaptation of A School Frozen in Time. It ran in Monthly Shōnen Magazine from December 2007 to April 2009, and was published in four volumes. At the time, he was also working on a one-shot manga prototype, which would eventually become his second serial, Sayonara, Football. It ran in Magazine E-no from June 20, 2009 to August 20, 2010, and was published in two volumes.

After finishing Sayonara, Football, he wanted to try something new. He eventually decided on doing a music-focused anime, however, his first attempt was turned down. To find inspiration, he decided to go back to the original one-shot he entered in the contest. He eventually created Your Lie in April. It ran in Monthly Shōnen Magazine from April 6, 2011 to February 6, 2015, and was published in eleven volumes. It won the award for Best Shōnen manga at the 37th Kodansha Manga Awards. He also made a spinoff manga for the Japanese blu-ray release of the anime adaptation and was later published in tankōbon format. He also did the illustrations for the light novel spinoff. Around this time, he also did an illustration for the endcard (the drawing at the end of the episode) for the fifth episode of Occultic;Nine.

For his next series, he decided to make a sequel to Sayonara, Football in the form of Farewell, My Dear Cramer. It ran in Monthly Shōnen Magazine from May 6, 2016 to December 4, 2020, and is being published in volumes, with fourteen having been released as of August 2022 (last release April 2021). A volume zero to Farewell, My Dear Cramer was also given out to people who saw the movie adaptation of Sayonara, Football in theaters.

On September 21, 2022, Arakawa released a preview for his new manga series, titled Atwight Game, in Kodansha's Weekly Shōnen Magazine. Arakawa announced via Twitter that the first issue of his manga would run in the magazine on September 28.

Works

Manga
 (2007—2009) (serialized in Monthly Shōnen Magazine)
 (2009—2010) (serialized in Magazine E-no)
 (2011—2015) (serialized in Monthly Shōnen Magazine)
 (2016) (included with the Japanese blu-ray release of the main series' anime adaptation)
 (2016—2020) (serialized in Monthly Shōnen Magazine)
 (2022—present) (serialized in Weekly Shōnen Magazine)

Other
 (2014) (illustrations)
 (2016) (episode 5 endcard)

References

External links
 

Living people
Manga artists
Winner of Kodansha Manga Award (Shōnen)
Year of birth missing (living people)